Feehan is a hard Irish surname. Notable people with the name include:

 Christine Feehan, American romance-paranormal writer
 Harold Feehan (1895–1979), Australian rules footballer
 Jimmy Feehan (born 1995), Irish Gaelic footballer
 John Feehan (born 1946), Irish geologist, botanist, author and broadcaster
 John M. Feehan (1916–1991), Irish author and publisher
 Patrick Feehan (1829–1902), American Catholic bishop
 Paul M. Feehan, Irish mathematician
 Richard Feehan (born 1960), Canadian politician from Alberta
 Sonny Feehan (1926–1995), Irish footballer
 Tim Feehan (born 1957), Canadian singer-songwriter  
 William M. Feehan (1929–2001), American firefighter; member of the Fire Department of New York